Sebastiania brasiliensis is a species of flowering plant in the family Euphorbiaceae. It was described in 1821. It is native from Colombia to Venezuela and Bolivia to Brazil and northern Argentina.

References

Plants described in 1821
Flora of South America
brasiliensis